Boldface may refer to:
 A variety of emphasis (typography)
 Boldface pointclass, a concept in descriptive set theory in mathematics

See also
Bold (disambiguation)
Bald face (disambiguation)